Storer's Regiment of Militia also known as the 3rd York County Militia Regiment was called up at York County, Maine then part of Massachusetts on August 14, 1777, as reinforcements for the Continental Army during the Saratoga Campaign. The regiment marched quickly to join the gathering forces of General Horatio Gates as he faced British General John Burgoyne in northern New York. The regiment served in General Briskett's brigade of Massachusetts militia. With the surrender of Burgoyne's Army on October 17 the regiment was disbanded on November 30, 1777, at Queman's Heights.

Massachusetts militia